Kawana Waters is an urban centre on the Sunshine Coast in Queensland, Australia, between Caloundra and Maroochydore along the Coral Sea coast. It was originally the estate development name and has passed into common usage, but it is not officially a town nor a locality. The official suburbs (listed below) are connected by the Nicklin Way arterial road. It is sometimes abbreviated to Kawana, which is a suburb of Rockhampton.

Many shopping and sporting facilities, including Kawana Shoppingworld are located in the Kawana Waters estate area.

Geography
Kawana Waters is a narrow urban area bounded roughly by Mooloolah River to the north and northwest, the ocean to the east and Currimundi Lake to the south.

The Kawana Waters urban centre consists of the following suburbs:

 Birtinya
 Bokarina
 Buddina
 Minyama
 Parrearra
 Warana
 Wurtulla

History 
The area was officially named Kawana Waters on 1 November 1968, having previously been known as Kawana Island.

Along with a number of other regional Australian newspapers owned by News Corp Australia, the Kawana/Maroochy Weekly newspaper ceased publication in June 2020.

Transport
The suburbs within the Kawana Waters estate area are served by Sunbus Sunshine Coast, who operate a bus interchange at Kawana Shoppingworld. Bus routes 600–619 connect Kawana Waters with Caloundra, Maroochydore, Buderim, Landsborough and Nambour.

Landsborough and Nambour stations on the Nambour / Gympie North Line offer regular services to Brisbane, operated by QR Citytrain. There are also coach services from Kawana Waters to Brisbane Airport.

Population
Census populations for the Kawana Statistical Local Area have been recorded since 1981 but covers more than just the area known as the Kawana Waters estate:

References

External links
 
 

 
Coastline of Queensland